The Bloskülb is a 570-metre-high hill in the central part of the Palatine Forest of Germany. It lies about three kilometres northwest of the village of  Iggelbach. It is located entirely within the territory of the municipality of Elmstein.

References 

Mountains and hills of Rhineland-Palatinate
Mountains and hills of the Palatinate Forest
Elmstein